"God So Loved" is a song by We the Kingdom that was released as the fourth single from their debut studio album, Holy Water (2020), on May 29, 2020. The song was written by Ed Cash, Scott Cash, Franni Cash, Martin Cash, and Andrew Bergthold.

"God So Loved" became We the Kingdom's second top ten entry on the US Hot Christian Songs chart, having peaked at No. 4. "God So Loved" received a nomination for the GMA Dove Award Worship Recorded Song of the Year at the 2021 GMA Dove Awards.

Background
We the Kingdom initially released the live performance version of "God So Loved" on October 25, 2019, as part of their debut extended play, Live at the Wheelhouse. An acoustic version of the song by the band was released on the Live Acoustic Sessions EP on March 6, 2020. The studio version of "God So Loved" then followed on May 29, 2020, as the third single from Holy Water (2020).

We the Kingdom shared the story behind the song, saying: 

On October 8, 2020, We the Kingdom released a new rendition of the song dubbed "God So Loved (World Version)" featuring Ayrton Day, Markus Fackler, Palankin, Victory Worship, André Aquino, NV Worship, and Veronika Lohmer, as a single.

Composition
The singers' vocal range spans from F3 to D5.

Accolades

Chart performance
"God So Loved" made its debut at No. 33 on the US Hot Christian Songs chart dated June 13, 2020, following its commercial release. The song broke through to the top ten sector of the chart at No. 9 on the September 5, 2020-dated chart, after thirteen weeks appearing on the chart. The song has since peaked at No. 5.

"God So Loved" debuted on the US Christian Airplay at No. 46, on the chart dated June 27, 2020. It spent seventeen weeks on the chart before reaching No. 1 on the October 17, 2020-dated chart.

Music videos
We the Kingdom released the live audio video of "God So Loved" on October 24, 2019. An acoustic performance video of "Holy Water" at the Boiler Room at Neuhoff Site, Nashville, Tennessee, was published on YouTube on the same day. We the Kingdom released the lyric video of "God So Loved" on May 30, 2020. The Storybrooke Sessions video was released to YouTube on June 9, 2020. The live music video of the song, recorded at Young Life Sharptop Cove in Jasper, Georgia, was released on June 19, 2020, on YouTube. On October 8, 2020, We the Kingdom released the World Version music video featuring Ayrton Day, Markus Fackler, Palankin, Victory Worship, André Aquino, NV Worship, and Veronika Lohmer was released to YouTube.

Track listing

Charts

Weekly charts

Year-end charts

Release history

References

External links
  on PraiseCharts

2019 songs
2020 singles
We the Kingdom songs
Songs written by Ed Cash